Killer Instinct is an out-of-print collectible card game (CCG) by Topps based on the Killer Instinct video game.

Description
The original set had 342 cards plus 6 promo cards. The premise of the game had players trying to overthrow the Ultratech corporation by recruiting fighters and winning the Killer Instinct tournament.

Publication history
It was first released in June 1996. The game was Nintendo's first foray into CCGs. The cards were marred by low-resolution graphics pulled directly from the video game. The 363-card set was sold in 60-card starter decks and 12-card booster packs.

Reception
In a review published in the December 1996 issue of The Duelist, Allen Varney states that Killer Instinct is an "excellent debut card game" for Topps. He also states that it has a "clever design" that will be enjoyable to a general audience, but especially to fans of the video game or the genre of tactical fighting video games. Varney did not like the computer-generated art, though he stated it allowed for consistency with screen captures from the video game used as art in the game. He was critical of "the cheesy T&A exploitation art on the booster boxes".

References

Further reading

External links

Collectible card games
Card games introduced in 1996